Lough Derg, historically Lough Dergart, is a freshwater lake in the Shannon River Basin, Ireland. It is the third-biggest on the island of Ireland (after Lough Neagh and Lough Corrib).

It is a long, narrow lake, with shores in counties Clare (south-west), Galway (north-west), and Tipperary (to the east). It is the southernmost of three large lakes on the River Shannon; the others being Lough Ree and Lough Allen. Towns and villages on Lough Derg include Portumna, Killaloe & Ballina, Dromineer, Terryglass, Mountshannon and Garrykennedy.

The lake's name evolved from the Irish Loch Deirgdheirc. This was one of the names of The Dagda, an Irish god, and literally means "red eye".

Geography
At its deepest, the lake is 36 metres deep and covers an area of 130 km2 (50.2 sq miles). Close downstream from where Lough Derg empties into the Shannon are the falls of Doonass, the largest fall on the otherwise gently sloping river. Nearby is the location of the hydroelectric power plant at Ardnacrusha, which, when built in 1927 was the world's largest.

Usage
In the nineteenth century, Lough Derg was an important artery from the port at Limerick to Dublin through the canals in the midlands of Ireland. Navigable over its full 40 km length, Lough Derg is today popular with cruisers and other pleasure craft, as well as sailing and fishing. The University of Limerick have an activity centre by the lake, just north of Killaloe, where there are canoes, kayaks, windsurfing, sailing dingies, and other recreations.

Lough Derg is home to an RNLI Lifeboat which is based at Dromineer, the first inland station in Ireland. In June 2013, 35 people were brought to safety when a major rescue effort was undertaken after an international rowing event was hit by severe weather.

Dublin City Council published a plan in 2011 for a pipeline to supply up to 350 million litres of water a day from Lough Derg to Dublin city and region. In 2016 the Parteen Basin at the south of lough was chosen as the proposed site of extraction. Water would be pumped to a break pressure tank at Knockanacree near Cloughjordan in County Tipperary and gravity fed from there to Dublin.

Ecology
A breeding pair of white-tailed eagles first nested on an island in Lough Derg in 2012. This marked a great success for the Irish reintroduction programme started in the summer of 2007.

Nitellopsis obtusa, an invasive alga in the family Characeae (stoneworts), was first recorded in Ireland in this lough in 2016. 
In 2021, invasive quagga mussels were discovered in the lake and in Lough Ree by a research team from UCD.

The North-East Shore is listed as a Special Area of Conservation.

Towns/villages
 Ballina
 Dromineer
 Garrykennedy
 Kilgarvan
 Killaloe
 Mountshannon
 Portroe
 Portumna
 Scarriff (location of regional Waterways Ireland office)
 Terryglass
 Whitegate

See also
 List of loughs in Ireland

References

 aerial view of Lough Derg's northern shores, featuring Terryglass  Drominagh and Kilgarvan Quay
 Alien species threatening ecology of Lough Derg Irish Examiner, 18 February 2011
 Asian clams threaten Lough Derg fish stock Dan Danaher, The Clare Champion, 21 June 2012.

Lakes of County Galway
Lakes of County Clare
River Shannon
Lakes of County Tipperary